is a general hospital located in Kita-ku, Nagoya, Japan, which is administered by the City of Nagoya. This hospital was established in May 2011, from the merger of two hospitals, Nagoya City Jouhoku Hospital and Nagoya City Jousai Hospital.

Overview 
NAGOYA CITY UNIVERSITY WEST MEDICAL CENTER has 500 beds. Its building has 8 floors that is total to 42,590.53 m2 floor area.

This hospital is putting a lot of resources into perinatal care, which is certified as Baby Friendly Hospital (BFH) by WHO and UNICEF. There are 36 beds in neonatal intensive care unit (NICU), which accepts neonates requiring intensive care from the north region of Nagoya city and its suburbs such as Kasugai city or Komaki city.

In February 2013, Nagoya Proton Therapy Center, which is the first proton therapy facility in the three Tokai prefectures of Aichi, Gifu, and Mie, was opened.

History 

Nagoya City Jouhoku Hospital was established in 1941.
Nagoya City West Medical Center was established in May 2011.
In February 2013, Nagoya Proton Therapy Center was opened.

Services 
Nagoya City West Medical Center offers the following services:

Access

This center is just 10 and 15 minutes by taxi from Sakae station and Nagoya station, respectively. There are direct bus routes from Sakae station, from Nagoya station and from nearest station, Kurokawa. This hospital was reached for about 5 minutes from the Kurokawa, Shonai-dori, or Torimi-cho exits on the Nagoya Expressway. Parking garage is next to the hospital, connected with the hospital via a passageway.

References

External links 

 
Nagoya Proton Therapy Center

Hospitals in Japan
Hospitals established in 2011
Teaching hospitals in Japan
Buildings and structures in Nagoya
2011 establishments in Japan